McCoy is a brand of pottery that was produced in the United States in the early 20th century. It is probably the most collected pottery in the nation. Starting in 1848 by J.W.McCoy Stoneware company, they established the Nelson McCoy Sanitary Stoneware Company in 1910. They continued on almost into 1991, but had to close down due to declining profits.

Origins
In April 1910, Nelson McCoy (Senior), with help from his father (J.W. McCoy) and along with five stockholders, established the Nelson McCoy Sanitary and Stoneware Company in Roseville, Ohio. The pottery produced utilitarian stoneware and operated successfully until about 1918. They also bought, sold, and mined clay. At that time the pottery joined with eleven other stoneware potteries and formed the American Clay Products Company (ACPC), which was located in Zanesville, Ohio. All of the member potteries produced stoneware to be marketed by the new company. The ACPC produced sales catalogs of the wares that were produced, which purposely had no trademark, and had salesmen to advertise and take orders. The pottery orders received by the company were shared among the different potteries based on production capability, and the revenue received was proportionally distributed.

The ACPC thrived until January 1926, at which time the company was liquidated. The demise of the company released the former member potteries to once again become independent and they went into direct competition with one another. Also around this time, the demand for utilitarian stoneware was beginning to decrease.

The rise
In order to re-establish its own identity, and also to reflect the changing times, the Nelson McCoy Sanitary and Stoneware Co. by 1929 had changed its name to the Nelson McCoy Sanitary Stoneware Co. Additionally, it was around this time that the company began the practice of marking its wares. No evidence has been found that the company had ever marked any of its wares prior to this time. In 1933, in response to a further decreased demand for food and sanitary wares, and an increased demand for decorative pieces, the name of the company was changed again to Nelson McCoy Pottery Co.

The decline
Nelson McCoy Sr., Nelson Melick, and later Nelson McCoy Jr., in turn, operated the pottery for 57 years until it was sold in 1967 to the owners of the Mt. Clemens Pottery Co., although Nelson McCoy Jr., remained as president of the pottery. After about seven years of operation the Lancaster Colony Corporation purchased the pottery in 1974. In 1981 Nelson McCoy Jr., retired. In 1985, the pottery was sold once again, this time to Designer Accents of New Jersey. Some months earlier, Designer Accents had acquired two other potteries, Holiday Designs of Sebring, Ohio, and their Sebring Studios division. Designer Accents also acquired the Sunstone Pottery of Cambridge, Ohio.

All production at these potteries was moved to the Nelson McCoy Pottery. The production of some of the wares formerly produced was continued, and other wares were discontinued. The ware formerly produced by Holiday Designs, being lower priced items, was discontinued, while the higher priced wares from Sebring Studios were continued for some time. The ware produced under the name Sebring Studios was marked with only a style number.

Selected items previously made by the McCoy pottery, and some newly designed items, were marketed by Designer Accents under the name Nelson McCoy Ceramics. Some of these items have the familiar McCoy name on them. The Floraline line with its distinctive mark, first produced by the Nelson McCoy Pottery in 1960, was also continued.

Designer Accents operated for about five years until closing in late 1990.

The McCoy trademark

The United States Patent and Trademark Office lists three individuals or companies that have applied for a Trademark using the name "McCoy" for use on pottery.

 Designer Accents, Inc., the final owner of the Nelson McCoy Pottery Company, filed the first of these applications on June 7, 1989. In the fall of 1990, the pottery closed. The application was canceled on December 20, 1997.
 On August 31, 1992, Roger Jensen from Rockwood, Tennessee, applied for use of the name "McCoy" as a trademark on pottery he made. The application stated that the first use of the proposed trademark was in January 1991. The application was canceled on May 25, 1999.
 A year before the Jensen application was canceled, Designer Accents, Inc. reapplied. This was on August 19, 1998. This application was abandoned on July 31, 2000.
 On October 28, 1999, Rosella Martin of Century, Florida, made application to use the name "McCoy" on numerous types of pottery she produced. On May 24, 2001, this application was abandoned.

Chronology
 1848 - Small Factory opened by W. N. McCoy
 1886 - J.W. McCoy opened Williams & (JW) McCoy Pottery Co.
 1890 - Merged & Renamed Kildow, Williams & McCoy Pottery Co.
 1892 - Renamed Midland Pottery Co.
 1898 - Sold to Roseville Pottery Co.
 1910 - J.W. McCoy assisted his son, Nelson, in establishing "Nelson McCoy Sanitary Stoneware"
 1911 - J.W. McCoy Pottery Company acquired by George Brush and it became "Brush-McCoy Pottery Co."
 1918 - McCoy family sold interest in Brush-McCoy but name did not change until 1925
 1933 - Nelson McCoy Sanitary Stoneware simplified name to Nelson McCoy Pottery Co.
 1967 - Sold to Mount Clemens Pottery Co.
 1974 - Sold to Lancaster Colony
 1981 - Nelson McCoy Jr. stopped working at Nelson McCoy Pottery Co.
 1982 - Brush-McCoy ceased operation
 1985 - Nelson McCoy Pottery Co. sold to Designer Accents & merged with their company, renamed "Nelson McCoy Ceramics"
 1989 - Designer Accent Applies for use of Trademark McCoy on Pottery
 1990 - Nelson McCoy Ceramics ceased operation
 1991 - Roger Jensen begins using McCoy trademark on pottery he produced in Tennessee
 1992 - Roger Jensen applies for use of McCoy trademark on Pottery
 1997 - Designer Accents' 1989 Trademark Application cancelled
 1998 - Designer Accent Applies a second time for use of Trademark McCoy on Pottery
 1999 - Roger Jensen's 1992 Trademark application was cancelled
 1999 - Rosella Martin applies to use the McCoy Trademark on pottery produced in Florida
 2000 - Designer Accents abandoned second McCoy Trademark Application
 2001 - Rosella Martin abandoned McCoy Trademark Application

References

Zanesville, Ohio
Ceramics manufacturers of the United States
Defunct manufacturing companies based in Ohio